Kasos or Casos or Casus was a city and polis (city-state) of ancient Greece on the island of Kasos. It was located in the interior of the island; its port was at Emporeion.

Its site is located near modern Kastro/Poli.

References

Populated places in the ancient Aegean islands
Former populated places in Greece